John Pinder (6 January 1945 26 May 2015) was a New Zealand-born Australian comedy producer and festival director who produced band performances, ran live venues and co-founded three Australian comedy festivals, including Melbourne International Comedy Festival and Circus Oz.

Early life 
Pinder was born in Timaru on the South Island of New Zealand and raised  further south in Oamaru, North Otago. His greatest influences while growing up were the circus and comedy. Pinder lived next door to a "circus lot" as a child, where Bullens Circus and Ashtons Circus regularly performed. Although his household didn’t have a television set, they used to sit down to listen to the radio as a family; when The Goon Show began being broadcast in New Zealand as Pinder hit puberty, he was the perfect age to enjoy the new form of comedy that his parents loathed. His subsequent career has included a great deal of work with comedians and circus performers.

1960s 
Pinder was working for the ABC when he produced his first concert/show and the first Lightshow Concert in Melbourne "The Electric Blues Thing" featuring Doug Parkinson in Focus, The Semblence of Dignity and the Ellis D Fogg Lightshow at the Carlton Cinema, 1968. During the late 1960s Pinder was a partner in a band management company called Let It Be inspired by the Beatles' song of the same name. This "rather hippie-esque business", as Pinder referred to it, managed Australian bands like Daddy Cool and Spectrum. His role was largely producing live shows, which led to the establishment of the T. F. Much Ballroom as a live venue. It was so successful that it established a brand that was taken on the road as The T. F. Much Rock Circus, touring with Ashtons Circus as part of the Aquarius Festival in Canberra.

1970s 
In the early 1970s Pinder established The Flying Trapeze Cafe, Australia's first comedy cabaret venue, in Melbourne. By 1977 he had opened The Last Laugh Theatre, Restaurant and Zoo (it had been built the year before). The Last Laugh is famous for discovering and featuring many comedians including Wendy Harmer, Mary-Anne Fahey, Brian Nankervis, Ian McFadyen, Peter Moon, Jane Turner, Richard Stubbs and many more who later appeared in such television comedy shows as The Comedy Company, The Big Gig, Fast Forward and The Late Show.

Pinder was closely associated with Circus Oz – a contemporary circus founded in 1977 – and is considered by many to be a non-performing founding member. He guaranteed their first bank loan, and Circus Oz enjoyed a long running season at the Last Laugh.

1980s 
In 1987, Pinder sold the Last Laugh to an employee, Rick McKenna, who ran the venue for a time with his sister Mary Tobin. While McKenna went on to become executive producer of hit Australian comedy show Kath & Kim, which stars his wife Gina Riley, Mary Tobin now produces and tours comedy acts around the world.

The decision to move on from the Last Laugh was aided by Pinder’s role, that same year, as co-ordinator of the very first Melbourne International Comedy Festival at venues across Melbourne, including the Last Laugh.

In 1988, Pinder developed a package of 50 Australian performers to appear under the banner Oznost in the Assembly Rooms at the Edinburgh Fringe Festival. Most of the shows were comedy productions and several travelled to other European festivals under the Australian Bicentennial banner.

Pinder subsequently moved to New York City, spending the end of the decade developing a music venue based in Harlem.

1990s 
A return to Sydney in the early 1990s gave Pinder the opportunity to develop a series of festival venues, including The Starfish Club for the Adelaide Fringe Festival, where Stomp and the Tokyo Shock Boys  had their Australian debut.

He followed up his fringe successes with Red Square, a vast outdoor arena build from 150 sea containers, for the 1996 Adelaide International Arts Festival, and The Starfish Club for the Sydney Festival and Sydney Theatre Company – which saw the return of Stomp from Off Broadway and the premier of the Australian international hit Tap Dogs. 
 
The 1990s also saw Pinder move into television, initially as a consultant on Steve Vizard’s Tonight Live (Rick McKenna was that show’s executive producer). Pinder’s services had been secured by Nick Murray who, at the time, was the general manager of Vizard’s company, Artist’s Services. When Murray moved on to become the founding CEO of Foxtel’s The Comedy Channel, he took Pinder with him to serve as a creative consultant. John continued to discover new talent such as  Rove McManus, whom he cast as one-half of the comedy puppets “Short and Curly”.

2000s 
In 2001, Robert Love, Director of the Riverside Theatres in Parramatta, asked Pinder to create a comedy festival around the Riverside Theatres hub. It became the Big Laugh Comedy Festival, and it ran until 2007. As Festival Director, Pinder was responsible for bringing The Goodies to Australia for a sell-out tour as part of the 2005 festival. He also co-produced the first live shows of The 3rd Degree, the comedy troupe which went on to become television sketch show The Ronnie Johns Half Hour.

In 2009, Pinder was part of the team that devised The World’s Funniest Island comedy event that takes place on Cockatoo Island in Sydney Harbour on the third weekend in October, and continued to serve as the event's director.

Death
Pinder died on 26 May 2015 after a bout of cancer.  He is survived by his partner Dasha and two daughters.

Notes and references

1945 births
2015 deaths
Theatre directors from Melbourne
Talent managers
People from Timaru
Deaths from cancer in Victoria (Australia)